"Knight Fall" is the eighteenth episode of the sixth season of the American medical drama House and it is the 127th episode overall. It aired on April 19, 2010 and was directed by Juan J. Campanella.

A knight in shining armor, William, becomes House's next patient. Foreman and Thirteen go to the Renaissance Fair to investigate.

Meanwhile, Wilson's new girlfriend is his first ex-wife. House confronts him and tries to ruin their relationship to protect him from being hurt again.

Plot 

At a medieval reenactment community, the queen picks one of the men, William, to fight for her honor. After a brief fight with the Black Knight, the man collapses, the whites of his eyes are shown filling with blood. The man playing the King, Miles, takes out a cell phone and calls for an ambulance.

At Wilson's condo, House is shown taking ibuprofen while in the nude when a woman named Sam shows up and 'soulless harpy" he never met. Wilson insists he does not want House to interfere. While in the MRI machine William complains of nausea and starts vomiting. While Foreman and Thirteen take environmental samples they notice a vomit-covered cow's eye in his tent. Miles explains that it's part of an eating ritual he makes the knights perform.

Back at the hospital, House dismisses their theory of food poisoning, noting no one else was sick. He tells them to run scratch tests for allergies and treat William with epinephrine in the meantime. William's heart seizes up and they discover red blisters on his chest, suggesting an allergy to epinephrine. House seeks Cuddy to talk about Wilson. Cuddy tells House not to get involved, although she admits that Wilson's first relationship with Sam ended very badly for both parties. She tells House that he might not like the answer should he make Wilson choose between himself and Sam.

Meanwhile, the patient, William, is experiencing worsening chest pain and tells Shannon to leave to get him a soda so that she does not have to know that he's in pain. Thirteen, seeing this, confronts William about his feelings for Shannon. At first, he denies that they are anything more than friends, but eventually William admits that he's in love with Shannon but out of respect for his honor code as a knight he does not want to break up her relationship with her fiancé, Miles.

House arrives to inform them that the blisters are caused by poison ivy, which he deduced from the poison ivy rash he got from handling William's sword. William seizes and Chase manages to revive him using epinephrine. The seizure eliminates MRSA as a cause and they conclude there must be some other environmental toxin. House suspects trichinosis and orders treatment and a muscle biopsy to confirm.

Wilson talks to House, trying to get him to lay off Sam. He is touched by his concern and grateful for House's protectiveness, but insists that he doesn't need House's help.

Wilson and Sam wait for House to arrive for a scheduled dinner in order for them to get to know each other better. They're surprised to see House arrive with a transgender prostitute, Sarah. House, however, is upset to see Sarah bonding with Sam and Wilson, and plugs his ears to ignore their laughter.

William has sudden shooting pains in his legs, indicating kidney failure. House, rubbing his leg and taking more ibuprofen, irritably orders them to check William's apartment, despite the fact that William has not been there in weeks. Foreman and Taub confirm that William's liver is filled with what appear to be tumors but when they magnify them on the scanner, they cannot identify them, but they do not appear to be cancer. Thirteen and Chase check out William's apartment, they find a sanctum dedicated to the black arts in a locked room. They bring his books and potions back to the hospital but confirm that the potions are not a poison. House , sucking on the lead from a pencil, notices that the figures from the model are lead and proposes lead poisoning as a diagnosis.

Wilson and Sam return to the condo surprised to find House cooking. He explains that he made dinner for them and apologizes for bringing Sarah. They have dinner together but as Wilson goes to the bathroom, House tells Sam she's a cold-hearted bitch who left Wilson damaged for years, and he does not plan to let her hurt him again, letting her know that he will outlast her. Wilson returns and they go back to pretending to like each other, leaving Wilson completely oblivious to this new development.

The next morning, House returns to his office and the team tells him there's no sign of lead poisoning, and William's heart and blood pressure are getting worse. House heads to the reenactment grounds himself with Thirteen. He finds that Thirteen agrees with him about Wilson, but assumes that the relationship won't last. House says that Wilson isn't like him or Thirteen (Thirteen replies, "Thanks for the compliment."), and that he lives by the knight's code William admires. Thirteen points out that it makes Wilson a great guy, but House says it makes him a vulnerable target, and someone needs to look out for him. House smells something from the apothecary shop and goes to investigate. House finds hemlock (a poisonous plant that resembles the common edible wild carrot) and confirms that the apprentice sold it to King Miles. Back at the hospital, House confronts Miles and accuses him of poisoning William. Miles denies it at first, and then claims that he bought it for the food challenge. Tests confirm that William has hemlock poisoning, Taub notes that the treatment still is not working. William should be dead by now or cured. Whatever he has, it is not hemlock intoxication.

Lucas brings House the results of his investigation into Sam. He tells House that there's nothing bad in the report, although he has not read her psychiatrist's notes. Sam comes in and asks to talk privately. Once Lucas leaves, Sam says that she understands why House suspects her, Sam says that they need to work together to make Wilson happy. She would like a chance to find out if she can make a new relationship with Wilson.

House tells the team that the lesions are peliosis hepatis lesions, which indicate infection on his heart that in turn indicate steroid abuse. The hemlock accelerated the steroid poisoning. Thirteen advises William to tell Shannon how he feels. William explains that Miles is a great guy and Shannon will have a great life with him. Thirteen replies that he's an idiot.

Later, House considers opening Sam's dossier, but then throws it away unopened. He then takes more ibuprofen for the pain.

Music 

 "Just the Motion" by Richard & Linda Thompson

Critical response 

Zack Handlen of The A.V. Club gave the episode a B− rating.

References

External links 
 

House (season 6) episodes
2010 American television episodes

fr:Knight Fall